Harttia kronei is a species of armored catfish of the family endemic to Brazil where it is found in the Ribeira de Iguape River basin.  This species grows to a length of  SL.

The fish is named in honor of the discoverer, naturalist-archaeologist Ricardo Krone (1861-1917).

References 
 

kronei
Fish of South America
Fish of Brazil
Endemic fauna of Brazil
Taxa named by Alípio de Miranda-Ribeiro
Fish described in 1908